The small group of , natively called , depending on classification, are either the most divergent form of Japanese, or comprise a branch of Japonic (alongside mainland Japanese, Northern Ryukyuan, and Southern Ryukyuan). Hachijō is currently spoken on two of the Izu Islands south of Tokyo (Hachijō-jima and the smaller Aogashima) as well as on the Daitō Islands of Okinawa Prefecture, which were settled from Hachijō-jima in the Meiji period. It was also previously spoken on the island of Hachijō-kojima, which is now abandoned. Based on the criterion of mutual intelligibility, Hachijō may be considered a distinct Japonic language, rather than a dialect of Japanese.

Hachijō is a descendant of Eastern Old Japanese, retaining several unique grammatical and phonetic features recorded in the Azuma-dialect poems of the 8th-century Man'yōshū and the Fudoki of Hitachi Province. Hachijō also has lexical similarities with the dialects of Kyushu and even the Ryukyuan languages; it is not clear if these indicate that the southern Izu islands were settled from that region, if they are loans brought by sailors traveling among the southern islands, or if they might be independent retentions from Old Japanese.

Hachijō is a moribund language with a small and dwindling population of primarily elderly speakers. Since at least 2009, the town of Hachijō has supported efforts to educate its younger generations about the language through primary school classes, karuta games, and Hachijō-language theater productions. Nevertheless, native speakers are estimated to number in the "low hundreds," and younger generations are not learning or using the language at home.

Classification and dialects
The Izu Islands dialects of Hachijō are classified into eight groups according to the various historical villages within Hachijō Subprefecture. On Hachijō-jima, these are Ōkagō, Mitsune, Nakanogō, Kashitate, and Sueyoshi; on Hachijō-kojima, these were Utsuki and Toriuchi; and the village of Aogashima is its own group. The dialects of Ōkagō and Mitsune are very similar, as are those of Nakanogō and Kashitate, while the Aogashima and Sueyoshi dialects are distinct from these two groups. The Utsuki and Toriuchi dialects have not been subcategorized within Hachijō, though the Toriuchi dialect has been noted to be very similar to the Ōkagō dialect in phonology. The dialect(s) of the Daitō Islands also remain uncategorized.

The Hachijō language and its dialects are classified by John Kupchik and the National Institute for Japanese Language and Linguistics (NINJAL), respectively, within the Japonic family as follows:

Proto-Japonic
 Proto-Japanese
Eastern Old Japanese
Hachijō language
 Ōkagō & Mitsune dialects (Downhill dialects)
 Nakanogō & Kashitate dialects (Uphill dialects)
 Sueyoshi dialect
 Aogashima dialect
Central Old Japanese (including Western Old Japanese)
Japanese language
 Proto-Ryukyuan
Ryukyuan languages

The dialects of Aogashima and Utsuki are quite distinct from the other varieties (and each other). The Aogashima dialect exhibits slight grammatical differences from other varieties, as well as noticeable lexical differences.

The villages of Ōkagō and Mitsune in the northwest are Downhill, while the villages of Nakanogō, Kashitate, and Sueyoshi in the south are Uphill—though the Sueyoshi dialect is not particularly close to those of the other "Uphill" villages. Therefore, the Sueyoshi dialect is often excluded from the term "Uphill dialects."

As the number of remaining speakers of Hachijō as a whole is unknown, the numbers of remaining speakers of each dialect are also unknown. Since the abandonment of Hachijō-kojima in 1969, some speakers of the Utsuki and Toriuchi dialects have moved to Hachijō-jima and continue to speak the Hachijō language, though their speech seems to have converged with that of the Downhill dialects. As late as 2009, the Toriuchi dialect had at least one remaining speaker, while the Utsuki dialect had at least five.

Phonology

Phonotactics
The coda  can only be present word-medially, and syllable nuclei can be short or long vowels.

The medial glide  represents palatalization of the consonant it follows, which also involves a change in place or manner of articulation for certain consonants. Like in Japanese, these changes can also be analyzed phonemically using separate sets of palatalized and non-palatalized consonants. Furthermore, when a vowel begins with the close front vowel , the preceding consonant (if any) becomes palatalized just as if a medial  were present.

Hachijō contrasts three syllable weights depending on their rimes:

 Light syllables end in a short vowel with no coda (e.g., ko).
 Heavy syllables have either a short vowel with a coda (e.g., koN), or a long vowel with no coda (e.g., koo).
 Superheavy syllables have both a long vowel and a coda (e.g., kooN).

Unlike light and heavy syllables, superheavy syllables are strongly avoided in Hachijō, and they are forbidden outright in most verbal inflections. Where they would occur, they are generally resolved by deletion of the coda or by shortening of the long vowel. Where the latter occurs, it can be written with a tie or as a short vowel, e.g., ⟨kogo͡oN⟩ or ⟨kogoN⟩ "in this way"; the former practice will be followed here. Though these shortened vowels are pronounced the same length as short vowels, they still follow the dialectal correspondences for long vowels (listed below).

Finally, there are a small number of words that contain N as a syllable nucleus instead of a vowel, such as NNmakja "tasty"  (stem NNma-, cognate to Japanese  uma-i).

Vowels
There are five short vowels found in all varieties of Hachijō:

Many of Hachijō’s long vowels are properly diphthongs, though the majority of them vary in quality based on region, being long monophthongs in some dialects and diphthongs in others. Therefore, in this article, the term "long vowel" will be used to include diphthongs as well. There are relatively straightforward correspondences between the dialectsʼ long vowels:

The long vowels aĭ, uĭ, and oĭ are comparatively rare, arising mainly from contractions.

Lastly, there are a very small number of discourse markers that contain nasal vowels, such as oĩ "Oh my!" and hõõ "Oh?" or "Oho!"

Consonants
Hachijō contains roughly the same consonants as Standard Japanese, with most consonants able to be followed by all vowels as well as by the medial glide .

Phonological processes

In addition to the variations described above, Hachijō also exhibits a handful of other conditioned sound alternations:

This change happens in addition to the palatalization of coronal consonants described below.

Palatalization of coronal consonants
When followed by the vowel  (short or long), or when combined with the medial glide , the coronal nasal n as well as all coronal obstruents—namely, t, d, c, z, s—change from an alveolar place of articulation to a palatal one. This change happens in addition to the affrication of t and d mentioned previously. Thus, t-j and c-j become cj , d-j and z-j become zj , s-j becomes sj , and n-j becomes nj .

Lastly, the coronal affricates c and z have a tendency to be sporadically palatalized to cj and zj; compare Utsuki mizoma  and Kashitate mizjoma  "sewer, drainage," cognate to Japanese 溝 mizo "ditch."

Vowel coalescence
Hachijō generally disallows vocalic segments in hiatus except for in the long vowels listed above. Where such a hiatus would appear (from compounding, affixation, consonant elision, etc.), coalescence generally occurs instead. For combinations of two vowels, the following chart gives a general overview:

Noteworthy irregularities or exceptions include:

 a-wo → ou, seen in the inflection of Class 1.1Aʼ verbs whose stems end in ...aw-, such as utaw- "to sing" → attributive *utaw-o → utou.
 e-wa → a, seen on personal pronouns with the topic-marking -wa in some dialects (ware-wa → wara).
 o-wa → a, seen in the verbal inflection of the stative -ar- (*-arowa → -ara), copula dara (*darowa → dara), new-type negative -Nn(ak)- (*-Nnakowa → -Nnaka), etc.

And although these rules are usually followed etymologically as well, there are some exceptions:

 *uwa → a, seen in words like *kuwa → ka "hoe" (related to Standard Japanese 鍬 kuwa).
 *ie → ei, seen in several Class 2 verbs such as *kierowa → keirowa "to disappear" (related to Old Japanese 消ゆ ki1yu, ki1ye-).
 *ue → ei, seen in words like *suerowa → seirowa "to set" (related to Standard Japanese 据える sueru).
 *ui → ei, seen in words like *uttui → uQcei "the day before yesterday" (related to Standard Japanese 一昨日 ototoi).
 *ei → ee, seen in a single word: *tame(s)ite → tameete "attempting" (participle form of tamesowa "to attempt," related to Japanese 試す tamesu).
 *owa → ou, seen in a single word: *kowasowa → kousowa "to destroy" (related to Japanese 壊す kowasu).

Coalescence can be blocked by leveling and reversed or altered by influence from other dialects or mainland Japanese.

Non-coalescence
As an exception to the vowel coalescence rules given above, there are special situations where the vowel  can diphthongize with another short vowel a, o, or u without coalescing with it, forming the long vowels aĭ, oĭ, or uĭ instead of the expected ee, ei, or ii. The frequency of such contracted forms depends on the dialect and individual.

Compare the following vocabulary:

Consonant gemination
The majority of consonants undergo no special changes when geminated, merely becoming longer, e.g.: t  →  Qt . However, there are a few main exceptions. These first exceptions usually arise by the prefixing of -final suffixes onto words:

 Gemination of h: When an h is made geminate, it becomes Qp —for example, oQ- (intensifier) + hesowa "to push" → oQpesowa "to push."
 Gemination of n and m: When an n or m is made geminate, it becomes Nn  or Nm , respectively—for example, hiQ- (intensifier) + magarowa "to bend" → hiNmagarowa "to bend."
 Gemination of s: When an s or sj is made geminate, an excrescent  causes it to become Qc  or Qcj , respectively—for example, hiQ- (intensifier) + simerowa "to tie" → hiQcimerowa "to tie." This feature occurs in all dialects except for Sueyoshi, which has Qs  and Qsj  in these cases.

Lastly, in the Uphill dialects (and occasionally for other dialect speakers as well), a sound shift has occurred wherein /N/ has become /Q/ when followed by a voiced obstruent:
 Special gemination of b, d, g, z: In the Uphill dialects, etymological Nb, Nd, Ng, and Nz have often changed into geminate Qb, Qd, Qg, and Qz. For example, the participle of jomowa "to read" in the Kashitate dialect is joQde  in contrast to most other dialectsʼ joNde .

Rendaku
Like all Japonic languages, Hachijō exhibits , wherein word-initial voiceless obstruents alternate with voiced ones in some compounds. The alternation is straightforward in Hachijō:

All other consonants are unaffected by rendaku.

Grammar

Hachijō is head-final, left-branching, topic-prominent, often omits nouns that can be understood from context, and has default subject–object–verb word order. Nouns do not exhibit grammatical gender, nor do they usually indicate grammatical number.

Hachijō preserves several grammatical features from Old Japanese—particularly Eastern Old Japanese (EOJ)—that are not reflected in Modern Standard Japanese, for example:

 Verbal adjectives use the attributive ending -ke, from EOJ. Contrast Western Old Japanese -ki1, Modern Japanese ～い -i.
 Verbs use the attributive ending -o ~ -ro, from EOJ. Contrast Western Old Japanese and Modern Japanese -u ~ -ru.
 Verbs use the stative derivation -ar-, from EOJ. Contrast Western Old Japanese -e1r-, obsolete in Modern Japanese.
 Verbs use the past tense -ci ~ -zi, from Old Japanese -si (attributive form of -ki1). This affix is obsolete in Modern Japanese.
 Verbs use the conjectural extension -naw-, descended from EOJ -nam-. Contrast Western Old Japanese -ram-, Modern Japanese -rō.
 The existence verb arowa is used with all subjects, without the animate–inanimate (iru–aru) distinction made in Standard Japanese.
 Relatedly, the verb irowa (cognate to Japanese iru) has only its original meaning of "to sit."
 The particles ga and no are both used to mark the nominative and genitive cases.
 Many interrogative particles are based on an-, such as ani "what," aNde "why," and aNsei "why." Contrast the Japanese cognates based on nan-: 何 nani "what," なんで nande "why," and なぜ naze "why".
 The Japonic grammatical phenomenon of  still occurs with the question particle ka (related to Japanese か ka) and the focus particles ka and koo (perhaps related to Japanese こそ koso). This phenomenon started disappearing in Japanese in Late Middle Japanese, and it was lost entirely in Standard Japanese around the Edo Period.
 Many cases of Proto-Japanese *e and *o are reflected as Hachijo e and o, as seen in EOJ. Contrast Western Old Japanese, which usually merged these vowels into i1 and u.

Hachijō has also had developments and innovations not found in Modern Standard Japanese:

 The final verb ending -u ~ -ru has been replaced by a new declarative -owa ~ -rowa for many uses.
 The participle (te-form) of k- and g-stem verbs end in -Qte and -Nde, in contrast to most Japanese dialectsʼ -ite and -ide.
 Several verb affixes have arisen based around an optative-like suffix -oosi, related in some way to the Middle Japanese optative ～ま欲し -(a)maosi.

Vocabulary
Hachijō contains a large number of vocabulary words whose phonetic shapes are not predictable from their Japanese cognates. These differences often reflect forms Hachijō inherited from Eastern Old Japanese (rather than from mainland Japanese’s ancestor of Western-Central Old Japanese) or irregular sound changes in one or both languages.

Hachijō also preserves vocabulary that has become obsolete in most Japanese dialects, such as:

There are some words which do occur in standard Japanese, but with different meanings:

Lastly, Hachijō also has unique vocabulary words whose relationship to Japonic are unclear or unknown:

See also
 Japanese language
 Japanese dialects
 Japanese phonology

References

Works cited

Further reading
 Sound clip and transcription of Hachijō
 Database of Endangered Languages of Japan

Japanese dialects
Languages of Japan